The Indian cricket team toured Bangladesh for two Tests and three One Day Internationals (ODIs) from 10 December 2004 to 27 December 2004. India won the Test series 2-0 and the ODI series 2–1.

Test matches

1st Test

2nd Test

ODI series

1st ODI

2nd ODI

3rd ODI

External links
 Cricarchive
 Tour page CricInfo
 Record CricInfo

2004 in Bangladeshi cricket
International cricket competitions in 2004–05
2004-05
Bangladeshi cricket seasons from 2000–01
2004 in Indian cricket